Scotiophyes faeculosa is a moth of the family Tortricidae. It is found in India, Thailand, Vietnam, Nepal and China (Likiang).

References

Moths described in 1928
Archipini